Bhekh Bahadur Thapa ( also spelled as Bhesh Bahadur Thapa) is a foreign affairs expert and diplomat. He is former Minister of Foreign Affairs of Nepal. He was fourth Governor of Nepal Rastra Bank from 14 August 1966 to 26 July 1967. He was Minister of Finance between 1976 and 1978 A.D after serving as State Minister of Finance and Secretary of Finance Ministry. He has twice served as Ambassador to USA (1980–1985 & 1996). He has served as former Nepalese ambassador to India from 1997 to 2003. He also headed the National Advisory Committee for 18th SAARC summit that was held at Kathmandu on November 2014. Currently, he is working as EPG (Eminent Person's Group) coordinator representing Nepal on reviewing bilateral treaties between India and Nepal.

Personal life 
He is married to Dr. Rita Thapa, a public health specialist. He has a son and two daughters. His son Bhaskar Thapa a tunnel engineer was a lead designer of the Caldecott Tunnel Fourth Bore. His elder daughter Tejshree Thapa, a human rights lawyer, lived in the Netherlands before passing away at the age of 52 in March, 2019. He has two grandsons Barun and Siddhant, through daughter-in-law Sumira Thapa, as well as a granddaughter, aged 19, through Tejshree.  His youngest daughter Manjushree Thapa is an English language author.

References 

Living people
Government ministers of Nepal
Governors of Nepal Rastra Bank
Finance ministers of Nepal
Foreign Ministers of Nepal
Ambassadors of Nepal to India
1937 births
People from Tanahun District
20th-century Nepalese businesspeople
Ambassadors of Nepal to the United States